The Riverview Hotel, on Main St. in Irvine, Kentucky, is a Classical Revival-syle building which was constructed in 19.  It was listed on the National Register of Historic Places in 1992.

It is a three-story brick building upon a stone foundation and was built sometime during 1913–18, during a period of oil exploration in the area.

References

Hotel buildings on the National Register of Historic Places in Kentucky
National Register of Historic Places in Estill County, Kentucky
Neoclassical architecture in Kentucky
1915 establishments in Kentucky
Hotel buildings completed in 1915